German submarine U-267 was a Type VIIC U-boat of Nazi Germany's Kriegsmarine during World War II. The submarine was laid down on 9 August 1941 at the Bremer Vulkan yard at Bremen-Vegesack as yard number 32, launched on 23 May 1942 and commissioned on 11 July 1942. She took part in seven patrols between 11 July 1942 and when she was scuttled at the war's end. She neither sank nor damaged any ships. U-267 was scuttled in Geltinger Bucht on 5 May 1945, later raised and broken up.

Design
German Type VIIC submarines were preceded by the shorter Type VIIB submarines. U-267 had a displacement of  when at the surface and  while submerged. She had two shafts and two  propellers.

U-267 was fitted with five  torpedo tubes (four fitted at the bow and one at the stern), fourteen torpedoes, one  SK C/35 naval gun, 220 rounds, and two twin  C/30 anti-aircraft guns. The boat had a complement of between forty-four and sixty.

References

Bibliography

External links

German Type VIIC submarines
U-boats commissioned in 1942
World War II submarines of Germany
1942 ships
Ships built in Bremen (state)
Operation Regenbogen (U-boat)
Maritime incidents in May 1945